Anderson Springs is a set of hot springs and a resort in Lake County, California.

Location

The community is located about 4 miles north of Middletown.
They are in southwestern Lake County,  from Calistoga. 

According to the Anderson Valley Homeowners Association, the permanent population as of 2004 was 403, with a seasonal population high of 986.

History

Anderson Springs were discovered in 1873, when the Anderson family took possession.
They became a popular resort.
As of 1914 they were owned by Miss Barbara Anderson, who had a hotel that could accommodate more than 100 people.
Eight of the springs were in active use.
The others were mostly above the hotel: Iron, ; Sour, ; Bellmer, ; Magnesia (or Father Joseph), ; Hot Sulphur and Iron, ; Iron and Magnesia, ; Steam Bath, .
A considerable amount of hydrogen sulfide gas escapes from the last two.

2015 Valley Fire

In September 2015, Anderson Springs was devastated in the Valley Fire. The fire caused two fatalities and destroyed 90% of the town's homes,  leaving most community members homeless. More than 1,000 people were living in shelters.

A video that was widely disseminated on the internet shows a man and his family escaping the area in his car, with fires burning on either side of the road.
The man had been driving a diesel van at the head of his family's 3-car convoy to escape from a house built in the 1930s by his great-grandfather. His mother, Sally Wolf, part of the escape party, said that they had never received the evacuation order, and had not seen flames from their house until "we rounded one last corner and then it was completely engulfed in flames and there was nothing we could do".

The community has started to organize cleanup and rebuild soon after the fire and numerous fundraisers have been created on platforms like GoFundMe to help finance the works.

References

Sources

External links

 Anderson Springs Community Alliance
 Escaping Anderson Springs during Valley Fire (YouTube)

Unincorporated communities in California
Unincorporated communities in Lake County, California
Resorts in Lake County, California
Springs of Lake County, California